Escuela Suiza de Barcelona is a Swiss international school in Barcelona, Catalonia, Spain.

It was established in 1919. The school serves levels Vorkindergarten (preschool) until Sekundarstufe II (senior high school).

References

External links
  Escuela Suiza de Barcelona
  Escuela Suiza de Barcelona

Barcelona
International schools in Barcelona
1919 establishments in Spain
Educational institutions established in 1919